Paul Fenimore Cooper (September 15, 1899 – January 20, 1970) was an American writer of children's books and non-fiction, some based on his travels. His first book was a translation of Albanian folk tales.

Life
Paul Fenimore Cooper was born in Albany, New York, in 1899, the son of the writer James Fenimore Cooper (1858–1938) and Susan Linn (Sage) Cooper (1866–1933). His uncle Henry M. Sage (1868–1933) became a state senator. Paul was a great-grandson of the novelist James Fenimore Cooper (1789–1851) and a great-great-grandson of William Cooper (1754–1809), the founder of  Cooperstown, New York. He was also distantly related to Nebraska State Representative Paul F. Clark.

Cooper grew up in Cooperstown. He was educated at the private Taft School, at Yale College, and at Trinity College, Cambridge. At Yale he was an editor of campus humor magazine The Yale Record.

He married Marion Erskine. Their son Paul Fenimore (P. F. Cooper, Jr.) became a physicist and Arctic explorer; he was elected a Fellow of the Arctic Society in 1954.

Some of Cooper's published books were Tricks of Women and Other Albanian Tales (1928), a translation of folk tales; Tal: His Marvelous Adventures with Noom-Zor-Noom (1929), a children's book about an orphan and the fantastical adventures he encounters on a quest to the land of Troom; Island of the Lost (1961), a non-fiction account of the Arctic expedition of Sir John Franklin, told within a "biography" of King William Island and the resident Eskimo; and Dindle (1964), a children's book about a dwarf who saves a kingdom from a dragon. Tal has had enduring popularity; it was reprinted in new editions in 1957 and 2001.

References
 
Other sources:
 Paul Fenimore Cooper at Purple House Press
 Obituary (1970) reprinted at JSTOR
The Cooper Genealogy (1983) at The James Fenimore Cooper Society (oneonta.edu/cooper)
 "Re: Henry Manning Sage of Albany" at GenForum (genealogy.com)

External links

 
 P. F. Cooper, Jr. at LC Authorities, with 2 records, and at WorldCat (combined with a later wetlands and groundwater specialist, probably)

1899 births
1970 deaths
American children's writers
Writers from Albany, New York
People from Cooperstown, New York
Taft School alumni
Yale College alumni
Alumni of Trinity College, Cambridge
American expatriates in the United Kingdom